Atamalek District is a district (bakhsh) in Jowayin County, Razavi Khorasan Province, Iran. At the 2006 census, its population was 15,094, in 3,891 families.  The District has no cities.  The District has two rural districts (dehestan): Hokmabad Rural District and Zarrin Rural District.

References 

Districts of Razavi Khorasan Province
Joveyn County